Juyik (also Romanized as Jūyīk; also known as Jūyīg) is a village in Bahu Kalat Rural District, Dashtiari District, Chabahar County, Sistan and Baluchestan Province, Iran. At the 2006 census, its population was 273, in 46 families.

References 

Populated places in Chabahar County